The Airbus/Rolls-Royce/Siemens E-Fan X was a hybrid electric aircraft demonstrator being developed by a partnership of Airbus, Rolls-Royce plc and Siemens.

Announced on 28 November 2017, it followed previous electric flight demonstrators towards sustainable transport for the European Commission’s Flightpath 2050 Vision.

A BAe 146 flying testbed was to have one of its four Lycoming ALF502 turbofans replaced by a Siemens  electric motor, adapted by Rolls-Royce and powered by its AE2100 turboshaft, controlled and integrated by Airbus with a  battery.
In April 2020, the programme was cancelled during the COVID-19 pandemic.

Development

Announced on 28 November 2017 at the Royal Aeronautical Society in London, the E-Fan X was initially planned to fly in 2020. 
It follows previous electric flight demonstrators: Cri-cri, e-Genius, E-Star and the E-Fan 1.2.
It will anticipate a safe, efficient, and cost-effective hybrid single-aisle airliner.
Airbus and Siemens have collaborated since April 2016 on the E-Aircraft Systems House for electric propulsion components, including ground tests.
It will help establish certification requirements for electric aircraft.

At the 2018 Farnborough Airshow, Greg Clark, Business and Energy Secretary, announced the UK Department for BEIS will commit a part of the £255 million invested to develop greener flight technologies.
At the June 2019 Paris Air Show, Rolls-Royce announced its acquisition of Siemens' electric propulsion branch, to be completed in late 2019, employing 180 in Germany and Hungary.
On 19 August 2019, the compact  generator was run for the first time in Trondheim, Norway, before integration with an AE2100 turboprop from a Saab 2000 feeding the battery pack and a Siemens SP2000 electric motor (with a 10 kW/kg power-to-weight ratio) replacing one Honeywell LF507 engine with a Rolls-Royce AE 3007 fan, through a 3,000 volts AC/DC distribution.
By November 2019, the airframe (G-WEFX) had arrived at Cranfield to be modified; first flight was then planned for 2021.

In April 2020, the programme was cancelled amid the COVID-19 pandemic.

Design

A BAe 146 flying testbed will have one of its four turbofans replaced by a  electric motor, with provisions to replace a second turbofan.
Airbus will build the control architecture and integrate the systems, Rolls-Royce will adapt the Siemens motor and the fan to the existing nacelle, bring the turboshaft, generator and power electronics and Siemens the electric motor and its power electronic control unit, the inverter, DC/DC converter and power distribution.
High-power propulsion systems are challenged by thermal effects, electric thrust management, altitude and dynamic effects on electric systems and electromagnetic compatibility issues.

An inboard  Lycoming ALF502 is replaced with a same thrust Citation X/ERJ-145 AE3007 nacelle, but with its core replaced with the electric motor and inverter and the C-130J's AE2100 turboshaft in the rear fuselage with its air inlet behind the wing – both using the V-22 Osprey tilt-rotor's Liberty T406 core.
While Rolls-Royce is experienced in industrial and naval applications, the  generator feeding a 3,000 V DC distribution through its AC/DC converter are firsts in aviation.
The motor and generator are not cryogenically cooled and not superconducting for more than 15% of losses but ultimate efficiency is not a prime target.

The Rolls generator is oil-cooled with supercritical carbon dioxide as the intermediary cooling fluid, building on Rolls-Royce LibertyWorks’ power system for the Aurora XV-24A LightningStrike: a high-speed VTOL aircraft scheduled to fly in 2018 with electric distributed propulsion using Rolls’ AE1107 turboshaft (with the same AE2100 core) driving three  Honeywell generators.
The nacelle outer mold line will be kept to maintain the BAe 146 airworthiness approval.

The electric machines should attain a 10-times-higher power-to-weight ratio.
Pressurization, insulation and separation will avoid the corona effect: high altitude, high voltage arcing.
Hybrid electric can offer improvements with present Battery Technologies : using them to boost power for takeoff and climb and electric-only descent would lower fuel burn per sector by double digits, and would reduce noise and local atmospheric emissions.

See also
 Airbus E-Fan

References

External links
 
 
 
 
 
 
 
 

Airbus aircraft
Hybrid electric aircraft
Proposed aircraft
Quadjets
Turboshaft-powered aircraft
High-wing aircraft